The 2010–11 St. Bonaventure Bonnies men's basketball team represented St. Bonaventure University in the 2010–11 NCAA Division I men's basketball season. The Bonnies, led by head coach Mark Schmidt, played their home games at the Reilly Center in Olean, New York, as members of the Atlantic 10 Conference.

St. Bonaventure failed to qualify for the NCAA tournament, but were invited to the 2011 College Basketball Invitational. The Bonnies were eliminated in the first round of the CBI in a loss to UCF, 69–54.

Roster 

Source

Schedule and results

|-
!colspan=9 style=|Exhibition

|-
!colspan=9 style=|Regular season

|-
!colspan=9 style=| Atlantic 10 tournament

|-
!colspan=9 style=| CBI

Source

References

St. Bonaventure Bonnies men's basketball seasons
St. Bonaventure
St. Bonaventure
St. Bonaventure men's basketball
St. Bonaventure men's basketball